Emilio Di Fulvio (born 17 May 1995) is an Argentine professional footballer who plays as a goalkeeper for Gimnasia Jujuy.

Career
Di Fulvio started his career with Rosario Central, beginning in the youth ranks from 2009. On 1 August 2016, Douglas Haig loaned Di Fulvio for the 2016–17 Primera B Nacional season. In total, he was an unused substitute forty times in all competitions but did make four appearances, which included his professional debut versus Flandria on 10 March 2017, as they were relegated to Torneo Federal A. He then returned to Rosario Central, subsequently making his first appearance for the club in a 3–0 loss to Patronato on 1 April 2018. Mitre completed the signing of Di Fulvio in the following July.

On 3 August 2020, Di Fulvio joined Gimnasia Jujuy.

Career statistics
.

References

External links

1995 births
Living people
People from General López Department
Argentine footballers
Association football goalkeepers
Argentine Primera División players
Primera Nacional players
Rosario Central footballers
Club Atlético Douglas Haig players
Club Atlético Mitre footballers
Gimnasia y Esgrima de Jujuy footballers
Sportspeople from Santa Fe Province